Mikhail Anatolyevich Shchennikov (born 24 December 1967, in Sverdlovsk) is a Russian race walker.

He was born in Sverdlovsk. His son Georgi Shchennikov is a professional footballer for PFC CSKA Moscow.

Achievements

External links

1967 births
Living people
Sportspeople from Yekaterinburg
Soviet male racewalkers
Russian male racewalkers
Olympic athletes of the Soviet Union
Olympic athletes of the Unified Team
Olympic athletes of Russia
Olympic silver medalists for Russia
Olympic silver medalists in athletics (track and field)
Athletes (track and field) at the 1988 Summer Olympics
Athletes (track and field) at the 1992 Summer Olympics
Athletes (track and field) at the 1996 Summer Olympics
Medalists at the 1996 Summer Olympics
Goodwill Games medalists in athletics
Competitors at the 1990 Goodwill Games
World Athletics Championships athletes for the Soviet Union
World Athletics Championships athletes for Russia
World Athletics Championships medalists
World Athletics Indoor Championships winners
World Athletics U20 Championships winners
World Athletics Race Walking Team Championships winners
European Athletics Championships winners
European Athletics Championships medalists
European Athletics Indoor Championships winners
Russian Athletics Championships winners
World record setters in athletics (track and field)
World Athletics indoor record holders